Mónica Janette Santa María Smith (6 December 1972 – 13 March 1994) was a Peruvian model and TV hostess. Born in Lima, she was one half of the original Nubeluz hostesses, a popular Peruvian children's TV show during the 1990s first lustrum. Her shocking suicide in early 1994 would affect the Nubeluz reputation, leading to the show cancellation in 1996.

Early life
Santa María was born in Lima to a Peruvian father (Danilo Santa María) and a Canadian mother (Judith Smith). She was the second of three sisters. She attended Colegio Nuestra Señora del Carmen, a Catholic private school in Miraflores. At the age of nine, she began modeling and landed her first TV commercial shortly thereafter. At the age of eleven, she starred in a TV commercial for a popular shampoo named "Ammen". When she turned 13, she became the face of a well-known Peruvian cosmetic company, Yanbal.

After successfully finishing high school in December 1989, she was chosen to be one of the hostess of a new children's TV show Nubeluz. Nubeluz became one of the most popular TV shows nationwide. Monica and Almendra Gomelsky, the most popular hostess, hosted Nubeluz from late 1990 to early 1994. Both were named "Dalinas", this was a short word for "Dama Linda" which means "Pretty Lady". Monica was named "La Dalina Chiquita" and was by far the most successful hostess in the show, earning the most money out of them all.

Death
Mónica Santa María was found dead on her bed on 14 March 1994 with an apparent gunshot wound. Her family members altered the crime scene hoping to hide that she had committed suicide. However, police concluded that she had in fact shot herself with a handgun between 2:30 am and 3:00 am on March 13 after an altercation with her then boyfriend, Constantino. Police discovered that Monica had left a message on Constantino's cellphone where she described her intention to commit suicide. Monica had tried to commit suicide before. She had been dead for 32 hours when her body was found. After Mónica's death Nubeluz began to decline until it ended in the summer of 1996. Monica was buried in the cemetery Jardines de la Paz in La Molina, Lima, Perú.

References 

1972 births
1994 suicides
Peruvian female models
Peruvian people of Basque descent
Peruvian people of Canadian descent
Peruvian people of English descent
Peruvian people of Spanish descent
Suicides by firearm in Peru
1994 deaths